Messmer is a surname, and  may refer to:

People 
 Henry Messmer (1866–1899), Swiss-American architect
 Ivan Messmer (July 23, 1931 – March 8, 2015), Canadian politician
 John Messmer (1884–1971), American athlete
  (1900–1987), French Roman Catholic bishop in Madagascar
 Magali Messmer (b. 1971), Swiss triathlete
 Mark Messmer, American politician
 Mindi Messmer, American politician
 Nikolaus Messmer (1954–2016), Russian Roman Catholic bishop, Apostolic administrator or Kyrgyzstan
 Otto Messmer (1892–1983), an American animator
  (1961–2008), Russian Jesuit priest, head of Jesuits in the CIS
 Pearl Ray Messmer (1892–?), an Australian orchidologist
 Pierre Messmer (1916–2007), French Prime Minister
 Sebastian Gebhard Messmer (1947–1930), Swiss-born Roman Catholic archbishop of Milwaukee
 Wayne Messmer, an announcer for the Chicago Cubs
 , stage name of Éric Normandin (b. 1971), French Canadian hypnotist

Other 
 Messmer High School (Milwaukee) (est. 1926), in the United States
  (est. 1852), a German tea and nutrition company
 Kunsthalle Messmer  (est. 2009), art gallery in Riegel am Kaiserstuhl, Baden-Württemberg, Germany
  (built 1902–04), a historic villa in Alzenau, Bavaria, Germany

See also 
 Mesmer (disambiguation)